Edward Lea (January 31, 1837 – January 1, 1863), was an officer in the United States Navy during the American Civil War. He was mortally wounded at the Battle of Galveston and died in the arms of his father, who was on the opposing side in the conflict.

Biography
Lea was born in Baltimore, Maryland, the son of Army engineer Albert Miller Lea and Ellen Shoemaker. He entered the Naval Academy at Annapolis on October 2, 1851, graduating on June 9, 1855, with the rank of midshipman. Lea was employed in active service on various stations, receiving promotion to passed midshipman on April 15, 1858, to master on November 4, 1858, and to lieutenant on November 22, 1860.

The ship was recalled, eventually arriving in Delaware Bay in December. Lea was subsequently promoted to lieutenant commander on July 16, 1862. Harriet Lane pushed further up the Mississippi that July to engage enemy batteries around Vicksburg, and was then assigned to the blockade of Galveston, which she helped capture in October 1862 in the Battle of Galveston Harbor.

When Confederate forces retook Galveston on 1 January 1863, Lea, serving as the first officer (XO) of Harriet Lane, was wounded in the abdomen and side. He subsequently succumbed to his wounds in the arms of his father, who was serving as a major of artillery in the Confederate Army, and who had witnessed the capture of the Harriet Lane by the gunboat  from shore, and had rushed to the ship to find his son dying.

Lea and his captain, Jonathan M. Wainwright were buried together at the Trinity Episcopal Cemetery in Galveston. After the war Wainwright was re-interred at the Naval Academy Cemetery in Annapolis, but when a relative suggested that Lea's remains be reburied next to his mother in the Green Mount Cemetery, Baltimore, Albert Lea refused, stating that his son would have preferred to remain where he had fallen in battle.

Namesake

The destroyer  was named for him, as is Camp #2 of the Sons of Union Veterans of the Civil War in Houston.

References

External links
 

1837 births
1863 deaths
Union Navy officers
United States Naval Academy alumni
United States Navy officers
People of Maryland in the American Civil War
Union military personnel killed in the American Civil War
Military personnel from Baltimore